Anna Nyamekye is a Ghanaian politician and was the Member of Parliament for the Jaman South Constituency of the Brong Ahafo Region of Ghana.

Early life and education 
Nyamekye was born on 25 November 1954.  She obtained a Bachelor of Arts degree in education at the University of Cape Coast.

Career 
Nyamekye is an educationist by profession.

Political career 
Nyamekye was the Member of parliament representing the Jaman South constituency in the 3rd and 4th  parliament of the 4th republic of Ghana. She also served as a Deputy Minister of Food and Agriculture. She was the Deputy minister in charge of livestock.

2000 Elections 
Nyamekye was first elected as the member of parliament for the Jaman South formerly, Jaman constituency in the 2000 Ghanaian General elections. She therefore represented the constituency in the 3rd parliament of the 4th republic of Ghana. She was elected with 19,720 votes out of 40,869 total valid votes cast. This was equivalent to 48.3% of total valid votes cast. She was elected over Nicholas Appiah-Kubi of the National Democratic Congress, Clement Anane of the National Reform Party, Stephen Kwabena Nkyibena of the Convention People's Party and Fadel Musah Gyasi of the People's National Convention. These obtained 18,807votes, 1,591votes, 403votes and 348votes respectively of the total valid votes cast. These were equivalent to 46%, 3.9%, 1% and 0.9% of the total valid votes cast. Nyamekye was elected on the ticket of the New Patriotic Party.  Her constituency was a part of 14 parliamentary seats out of a total 21 seats won by the New Patriotic Party in that elections in the Brong Ahafo Region of Ghana. The electorates in that constituency's elections for that year voted in ‘skirt and blouse’ manner as the presidential candidate that won was from the major opposition party National Democratic Congress.  In all, the New Patriotic Party, though, won a majority total of 100 parliamentary representation out of 200parliamentary seats in the 3rd parliament of the 4th republic of Ghana.

2004 Elections 
Nyamekye was re-elected as the member of parliament for the Jaman South constituency in the 2004 Ghanaian general elections. She thus represented the constituency in the 4th parliament of the 4th republic of Ghana. She was elected with 17,842votes out of 31,219 total valid votes cast.5,6 This was equivalent to 57.2% of the total valid votes cast. She was elected over Osei Koranteng of People's National Convention, Ahmed Shams Dinu of the National Democratic Congress, Oteng Agyeman Jacob of the Convention People's Party and Oppong Kwabena Martin of the Democratic People's Party.5,6 These obtained 782 votes, 12,085votes, 337 votes and 173votes respectively. These were equivalent to 2.5%, 38.7%, 1.1% and 0.6% respectively of the total valid votes cast. Nyamekye was elected again on the ticket of the New Patriotic Party. Her constituency was a part of 14 parliamentary seats out of a total 24 seats won by the New Patriotic Party in the Brong Ahafo region of Ghana in that elections. In all, the New Patriotic Party won an majority total of 114 parliamentary representation out of a total 230 seats in the 4th parliament of the 4th republic of Ghana.

Personal life 
Nyamekye is a Christian.

References

1954 births
Living people
Ghanaian MPs 2001–2005
Ghanaian MPs 2005–2009
New Patriotic Party politicians
21st-century Ghanaian politicians
Ghanaian Christians
University of Cape Coast alumni